Alexander George McCarthy) (May 12, 1889 - March 12, 1978) was a professional baseball infielder. He played all or part of eight seasons in Major League Baseball from 1910 to 1917. He played over 100 games each as a second baseman, shortstop and third baseman.

Professional baseball career 
In 1910, McCarthy was purchased by the Pittsburgh Pirates from the South Bend Bronchos of the Central League. He played with the Pirates until 1915, when he was purchased by the Chicago Cubs. The following year, he returned to Pittsburgh when the Pirates purchased him from the Cubs.

In 1918, McCarthy was traded to the Kansas City Blues of the American Association to complete a deal that included Fritz Mollwitz. McCarthy continued to play in the minor leagues until 1927. He served as player-manager of the Blues in 1920, and of the Springfield Senators of the Illinois–Indiana–Iowa League in 1926-27.

Personal life 
He attended the University of Notre Dame, but did not play baseball at the collegiate level.

Notes

References 

Major League Baseball second basemen
Major League Baseball shortstops
Major League Baseball third basemen
Notre Dame Fighting Irish baseball players
Pittsburgh Pirates players
Chicago Cubs players
South Bend Bronchos players
Kansas City Blues (baseball) players
Milwaukee Brewers (minor league) players
Springfield Senators players
Baseball players from Chicago
University of Notre Dame alumni
1889 births
1978 deaths
Kansas City Blues (baseball) managers